Ahmed Mejri (born January 2, 1990) is a Tunisian lightweight amateur boxer who won the 2011 All-Africa Games.

He also won the 2012 African Boxing Olympic Qualification Tournament in his weight class.
At the 2012 Summer Olympics he beat Shafiq Chitou then lost to Felix Verdejo 7:16.

References

External links
 

1990 births
Living people
Sportspeople from Tunis
Lightweight boxers
Boxers at the 2012 Summer Olympics
Olympic boxers of Tunisia
Tunisian male boxers
African Games gold medalists for Tunisia
African Games medalists in boxing
Competitors at the 2013 Mediterranean Games
Competitors at the 2018 Mediterranean Games
Competitors at the 2011 All-Africa Games
Mediterranean Games competitors for Tunisia
21st-century Tunisian people
20th-century Tunisian people